Valkenisse is the name of two locations in Zeeland, the Netherlands:

 Valkenisse, Walcheren
 Valkenisse, Zuid-Beveland